Charles Murray Harris (April 10, 1821 – September 20, 1896) was a U.S. Representative from Illinois. Born in Munfordville, Kentucky, Harris attended the common schools. He studied law. He was admitted to the bar. He moved to Illinois and located in Oquawka, Illinois, where he commenced the practice of his profession. Harris was elected as a Democrat to the Thirty-eighth Congress (March 4, 1863 – March 3, 1865). He was an unsuccessful candidate for reelection in 1864 to the Thirty-ninth Congress. He died in Chicago, Illinois, September 20, 1896. He was interred in Oquawka, Illinois.

External links

1863 Mathew Brady photo of Charles M. Harris

1821 births
1896 deaths
People from Munfordville, Kentucky
People from Henderson County, Illinois
Illinois lawyers
Democratic Party members of the United States House of Representatives from Illinois
19th-century American politicians
19th-century American lawyers